"You Must Go On" is the fifth single from Bernard Butler released in October 1999. It was the second single taken from the album Friends and Lovers and charted at number 44 on the UK Singles Chart.

In a promotional interview for the album, Butler said: "The new single is about pushing myself on, but it's mainly about grief, it's quite a sad song.
It's about dealing with things that happen in life. People die, you can't cry about it for the rest of your life."

Single track listings

References

1999 singles
Songs written by Bernard Butler
Creation Records singles
1998 songs